Commerce School Public Schools is a school district headquartered in Commerce, Oklahoma.

The district includes Commerce, North Miami, and a section of Miami.

In 2009 the Picher-Cardin Public Schools closed and was dissolved. A portion went to the Commerce school district. 

In 2014 the school district banned vaping. The district superintendent, Jimmy R. Haynes, favored the state of Oklahoma addressing the issue on a statewide level.

Schools
 Commerce High School
 Commerce Middle School
 Alexander Elementary School

References

External links
 Commerce Public Schools
School districts in Oklahoma
Education in Ottawa County, Oklahoma